Iron has a long and varied tradition in the mythology and folklore of the world. 

While iron is now the name of a chemical element, the traditional meaning of the word "iron" is what is now called wrought iron. In East Asia, cast iron was also common after 500 BCE, and was called "cooked iron", with wrought iron being called "raw iron" (in Europe, cast iron remained very rare until it was used for cannonballs in the 14th century). At the end of the Bronze Age and beginning of the Iron Age, tools (including weapons) of iron replaced those of bronze, and iron-using cultures replaced bronze-using cultures. Many early legends spring from this transition, such as Homeric epic and the Vedas, as well as major cultural shifts in Africa. Iron mixed with larger amounts of carbon has very different working properties and structural properties, and is called steel. Steel was rare; making it was difficult and somewhat unpredictable, and steelworkers were often associated with supernatural skill, until the Industrial Revolution. Now, steel is cheaper to make, and most of what is now sold as "wrought iron" is in fact mild steel. See ferrous metallurgy for more historical detail.

In Europe

Cold iron

"Cold iron" is historically believed to repel, contain, or harm ghosts, fairies, witches, and other malevolent supernatural creatures.  This belief continued into later superstitions in a number of forms:

 Nailing an iron horseshoe to a door was said to repel evil spirits or, later, to bring good luck.
 Surrounding a cemetery with an iron fence was thought to contain the souls of the dead.
 Burying an iron knife under the entrance to one's home was alleged to keep witches from entering.

"Cold iron" is a substitute name used for various animals and incidences considered unlucky by Irish fishermen. A similar phenomenon has been found with Scottish fishermen.

Horseshoes

Horseshoes are considered a good luck charm in many cultures, including those of England, Denmark, Lithuania, and Estonia, and its shape, fabrication, placement and manner of sourcing are all important. A common belief is that if a horseshoe is hung on a door with the two ends pointing up then good luck will occur. However, if the two ends point downwards then bad luck will occur. Traditions do differ on this point, however. In some cultures, the horseshoe is hung points down (so the luck pours onto a person standing under it); in others, it is hung points up (so the luck does not fall out); in others it does not matter so long as the horseshoe has been used (not new), was found (not purchased), and can be touched. In all traditions, luck is contained in the shoe and can pour out through the ends.

In some traditions, any good or bad luck achieved will only occur to the owner of the horseshoe, not the person who hangs it up. Therefore, if the horseshoe was stolen, borrowed or even just found then the owner, not the person who found or stole the horseshoe, will get any good or bad luck. Other traditions require that the horseshoe be found to be effective.

One reputed origin of the tradition of lucky horseshoes is the story of Saint Dunstan and the Devil. Dunstan, who would become the Archbishop of Canterbury in CE 959, was a blacksmith by trade. The story relates that he once nailed a horseshoe to the Devil's hoof when he was asked to reshoe the Devil's horse. This caused the Devil great pain, and Dunstan only agreed to remove the shoe and release the Devil after the Devil promised never to enter a place where a horseshoe is hung over the door.

Another possible reason for the placing of horseshoes above doorways is to ward off faeries, the supposition being that supernatural beings are repelled by iron and as horseshoes were an easily available source of iron, they could be nailed above a door to prevent such beings entering a house.

Meteoric iron in Tibet
Thogcha means 'sky-iron' in Tibetan.  Meteoric iron was highly prized throughout the Himalayas, where it was included in sophisticated polymetallic alloys for ritual implements such as the singing bowl (Jansen, 1992) and phurba (Müller-Ebeling, et al., 2002).

Beer (1999: p. 234) states that:

In Judaism
In the Bible at Judges 1:19, God was unable to lead the nation of Judah to victory against the Valleymen due to them having chariots of iron.
"And the LORD was with Judah; and he drave out the inhabitants of the mountain; but could not drive out the inhabitants of the valley, because they had chariots of iron."

In fiction 
Cold iron is a poetic term for iron. Francis Grose's 1811 Dictionary of the Vulgar Tongue defines cold iron as "A sword, or any other weapon for cutting or stabbing." This usage often appears as "cold steel" in modern parlance.

Rudyard Kipling's poem "Cold Iron", found in his 1910 collection of stories Rewards and Fairies, used the term poetically to mean "weapon".

In his novel Redgauntlet, the Scottish author Sir Walter Scott wrote, "Your wife's a witch, man; you should nail a horse-shoe on your chamber-door."

In modern fantasy, cold iron may refer to a special type of metal, such as meteoric iron or unworked metal. Weapons and implements made from cold iron are often granted special efficacy against creatures such as fairies and spirits.

In the Disney film Maleficent, the title character reveals early on that iron is lethal to fairies, and that the metal burns them on contact.

In the Pokémon games, Pokémon categorized as Fairy-types are weak against moves that are categorized as Steel-type. Fairy-type moves are also less effective than other types of moves against Pokémon of the Steel-type.

See also
 
 Silver bullet

References

Further reading

 Finneran, Niall (2003). Ethiopian evil eye belief and the magical symbolism of iron working. Source: 
 Lawlor, Robert (1991). Voices of the First Day: Awakening in the Aboriginal Dreamtime. Rochester, Vermont: Inner Traditions International, Ltd. 
 Jansen, Eva Rudy (1992). Singing bowls: a practical handbook of instruction and use. Holland: Binkey Kok Publications. (Refer partial scanning of book on following metalinkage (accessed: 1 December 2006) .)
 Müller-Ebeling, Claudia and Christian Rätsch and Surendra Bahadur Shahi (2002). Shamanism and Tantra in the Himalayas. Transl. by Annabel Lee. Rochester, Vt.: Inner Traditions.
 
 
 Briggs, Robin. Witches & Neighbours: The Social and Cultural Context of European Witchcraft. Bury St. Edmunds, Suffolk: HarperCollins Publishers. 1996. .
 Elworthy, Frederick Thomas. The Evil Eye: An Account of This Ancient and Widespread Superstition. New York: Bell Publishing Company. 1989. . Reprint of the 1895 original.
 Guiley, Rosemary Ellen. The Encyclopedia of Witches and Witchcraft. New York: Facts On File, 1989. .
 Lawrence, Robert Means, M.D. The Magic of the Horseshoe with Other Folk-Lore Notes. Boston and New York: Houghton, Mifflin, and Company, 1898.
 Garrad, Larch S. “Additional Examples of Possible House Charms in the Isle of Man.” Folklore 100 (1989): 110–112.
 Tebbett, C. F. “Iron Thresholds as a Protection.” Folklore 91 (1980): 240.

Fairies
Folklore
Objects in folklore
Witchcraft in folklore and mythology